The Spanish Autovía A-21 is a highway between Jaca, in Aragon, and Iruña/Pamplona, in Navarre which is partially open and partially under construction.

It follows or is an upgrade of the N-240 and links the Autovía A-15 east of Iruña/Pamplona with the Autovía A-23 at Jaca providing a link through the southern Pyrenees and connections to France, Huesca and Zaragoza.

Phases
Construction began at the Iruña/Pamplona end of the route, so while the sections in Navarre were completed by 2012, only six out of the eight sections in Aragon (totaling about 31 km) are open. One more section (7 km) is under construction in Aragon but work has not yet started on one further section (11.6 km). Seven financial institutions funded the construction of the highway.

References

A-21
A-21
A-21